James McConnell (1815–1883) was a British engineer of the London and North Western Railway.

James McConnell may also refer to:
 James McConnell (chess), (1829–1917), Louisiana lawyer who played chess with Morphy and other champions, see Sacrifice
 James V. McConnell (1925–1990), American biologist
 James McConnell (Medal of Honor) (1878–1918), Philippine–American War Medal of Honor recipient
 James E. McConnell (1903–1995), British book and magazine cover artist
 James Robert McConnell (1915–1999), Irish theoretical physicist and Roman Catholic priest
 James Rogers McConnell (1887–1917), World War I Aviator
 James McConnell (footballer), English footballer

See also 
 James McConnell Anderson (1907–1998), American artist